Thomas "Tom" Bruce Domres (October 19, 1946November 8, 1999) was a professional American football defensive tackle in the American Football League (1968–1970) and the National Football League (1970–1972). Born in Marshfield, Wisconsin, he played for the Houston Oilers (1968–1971) and the Denver Broncos (1971–1972). He played at the collegiate level at the University of Wisconsin–Madison.

See also
 Other American Football League players

References

External links

1946 births
1999 deaths
People from Marshfield, Wisconsin
Players of American football from Wisconsin
American football defensive tackles
Wisconsin Badgers football players
Houston Oilers players
Denver Broncos players
American Football League players